St. Peter's Community School is a mixed-sex second level community school in Passage West, a commuter town of Cork, Ireland. It officially opened in 1988.

As of 2020, there were over 360 pupils enrolled in the school. Past pupils include rugby player Rory Parata, and politician Michael McGrath.

References

Secondary schools in County Cork
Educational institutions established in 1988
Community schools in the Republic of Ireland
1988 establishments in Ireland